Felix Mendelssohn wrote four pieces for string quartet that were published together as his “Opus 81” after his death. They have at times wrongly been presented as a single work, even as his “String Quartet No. 7”:

Tema con variazioni (Andante sostenuto) in E Major, Op. 81/1, written in 1847; 
''Scherzo (Allegro leggiero) in A Minor, Op. 81/2, also from 1847; Capriccio (Andante con moto) in E Minor, Op. 81/3, from 1843; and the earlier Fugue (A tempo ordinario)'' in E-flat Major, Op. 81/4, written in 1827.

External links 

String quartets by Felix Mendelssohn
1847 compositions